Law enforcement in Jersey is carried out by 14 agencies - one paid islandwide police force, one paid customs and immigration enforcement service and twelve parish Honorary Police forces, one for each parish.

Island-wide law enforcement is managed by the States of Jersey:
States of Jersey Police
States of Jersey Customs and Immigration Service

References 

Law enforcement in the Channel Islands